Nicotinamide riboside kinase 2 is an enzyme that in humans is encoded by the ITGB1BP3 gene.

Interactions
ITGB1BP3 has been shown to interact with ST7.

References

Further reading